The NCAA Division II Field Hockey Championship is an annual single-elimination tournament conducted by the National Collegiate Athletic Association to determine the national champion of women's Division II collegiate field hockey in the United States. The tournament was held from 1981 and 1983, discontinued from 1984 and 1991, was re-instated in 1992, and has been held every year since.

Between 1984 and 1991, when the Division II tournament was not held, Division II teams competed in the NCAA Division III Field Hockey Championship.

The most successful team are the Bloomsburg Huskies, with thirteen titles. East Stroudsburg are the current champions, winning their second national title in 2022.

Teams from Pennsylvania have historically dominated the tournament. Aside from 1981, every year that small college championships have been conducted (AIAW: 1979 to 1981, NCAA: 1981 to 2012), one or more teams from Pennsylvania have played in either or both Division II and Division III national title games, winning 29 of 38 such games.

Format
Currently, 6 teams compete in each national championship tournament. The first round is typically played on the campus of the higher-seeded teams. The semifinal and championship rounds are held at a pre-determined site. The 2019 finals were hosted by the Millersville University of Pennsylvania.

Results

Champions

 Schools highlight in yellow have reclassified athletics from NCAA Division II.

See also
NCAA Division I Field Hockey Championship
NCAA Division III Field Hockey Championship
AIAW Intercollegiate Women's Field Hockey Champions
USA Field Hockey Hall of Fame

References

External links
NCAA Division II field hockey

 
NCAA2
Field hockey
1981 establishments in the United States
Recurring sporting events established in 1981